The Sony Vaio TP series was a series of living room PCs part of Sony's Vaio line that sold from 2007 through 2008.

Models

References

TP
Computer-related introductions in 2007
Consumer electronics brands